Panayot Mitov Panayotov (30 December 1930 – 1996) was a Bulgarian football forward who played for Bulgaria in the 1962 FIFA World Cup.

Career
Panayotov began his playing career with Sportist Sofia. In 1949, after merger of Sportist and Sredets, he joined the new formed club DSO Cherveno Zname.

In early 1950, Panayotov joined CSKA Sofia, where he won eleven A Group titles and four Bulgarian Cups. During his fourteen years with CSKA, he scored 68 goals in 294 matches.

Honours

Club
CSKA Sofia
 A Group (11): 1951, 1952, 1954, 1955, 1956, 1957, 1958, 1958–59, 1959–60, 1960–61, 1961–62
 Bulgarian Cup (4): 1951, 1954, 1955, 1961

International
Bulgaria
Olympic Bronze Medal: 1956

References

External links
FIFA profile

1930 births
1996 deaths
Footballers from Sofia
Bulgarian footballers
Bulgaria international footballers
Association football forwards
PFC CSKA Sofia players
First Professional Football League (Bulgaria) players
1962 FIFA World Cup players
Olympic footballers of Bulgaria
Footballers at the 1952 Summer Olympics
Footballers at the 1956 Summer Olympics
Olympic bronze medalists for Bulgaria
Olympic medalists in football
Medalists at the 1956 Summer Olympics